No. 640 Squadron RAF was a heavy bomber squadron of the Royal Air Force during the Second World War.

History
No. 640 Squadron was first formed at RAF Leconfield, East Riding of Yorkshire on 7 January 1944, from 'C' Flight of No. 158 Squadron RAF. It was equipped with Halifax Mk.III bombers, and operated as part of No. 4 Group in Bomber Command. It re-equipped with Halifax VI bombers in March 1945, and was disbanded at RAF Leconfield on 7 May of that year.

Operational Highlights

 First Operational Mission 5 Halifaxes bombed Berlin while 3 others aborted on the night from 20 to 21 January 1944
 Last Operational Mission 18 Halifaxes bombed gun batteries on the island of Wangerooge on 25 April 1945

Aircraft operated

Squadron Bases

References

Notes

Bibliography

External links

 History of No. 640 Squadron (broken link)
 No. 640 Squadron RAF movement and equipment history (broken link)
 Squadron histories for nos. 621–650 sqn of RAF Web (broken link)
A Facebook group for relatives of squadron members

640 Squadron
Military units and formations established in 1944
Military units and formations disestablished in 1945